Haguro Station (羽黒駅) is the name of two train stations in Japan:

 Haguro Station (Aichi)
 Haguro Station (Ibaraki)